Mars Red Sky is a stoner rock band from Bordeaux, France.

Background
Formed in 2007, Mars Red Sky originates in Bordeaux, France, and is made up of Julien Pras (guitar, vocals), Jimmy Kinast (bass, vocals), and Mathieu Gazeau (drums).  Their music is a blend of psychedelic rock and stoner rock.

Festivals and tours
The band has played at Eurockéennes, Levitation, the Roadburn Festival, and South by Southwest. In 2016, they toured North America.

Short film
In October 2016, Mars Red Sky released the short film Alien Grounds, which included music from their album Apex III.
The film is directed by Sebastien Antoine and features actors Yan Tual, Victoria Cyr, and Dan Bronchinson.

Band members

Discography

Studio albums
 Mars Red Sky (2011)
 Stranded in Arcadia (2014)
 Apex III (Praise for the Burning Soul) (2016)
 The Task Eternal (2019)

EPs
 Curse/Sádaba (2010)
 Green Rune White Totem (split/collaboration with Year of No Light) (2012)
 Be My Guide (2013)
 Hovering Satellites (2014)
 Providence (2016)
 Myramyd (2017)

References

External links
 

Musical groups from Bordeaux
French stoner rock musical groups
Musical groups established in 2007